Obsession is the seventh studio album by English rock band UFO, released in 1978. This was the final studio album to feature Michael Schenker on lead guitar until he returned to the band in 1993.
A single from the album, "Only You Can Rock Me" / "Cherry", was also released in 1978. So too was the band's first 3-track EP "Only You Can Rock Me", "Cherry" / "Rock Bottom", reaching No. 50 in the UK. The album was recorded at an abandoned post office in Los Angeles.

EMI's 2008 remastered edition includes 3 bonus live tracks, and also some writing credits are corrected.

Critical reception 
Reviewing the LP in Christgau's Record Guide: Rock Albums of the Seventies (1981), Robert Christgau wrote: "I've admired their forward motion and facile riffs, so it's my duty to report that they've degenerated into the usual exhibitionism. Theme song: 'Lookin' Out for No. 1,' a turn of phrase that's becoming as much of a watchword in late '70s rock as 'get together' was in the late '60s."

Track listing

Personnel
UFO
Phil Mogg – vocals
Pete Way – bass
Andy Parker – drums
Michael Schenker – guitars, recorder
Paul Raymond – keyboards, guitar

Production
Ron Nevison – producer
Mike Clink – assistant engineer
Alan McMillan – conductor, string arrangements, string conductor
Hipgnosis – cover art

Charts

References

UFO (band) albums
1978 albums
Albums produced by Ron Nevison
Chrysalis Records albums
Albums with cover art by Hipgnosis